The 1991 NCAA Division I women's volleyball tournament began with 32 teams and ended on December 21, 1991, when UCLA defeated Long Beach State 3 games to 2 in the NCAA championship match.

UCLA won the program's third NCAA title and successfully defended their 1990 NCAA title by defeating Long Beach State in five games. After losing the first two games by the scores of 15-12, 15-13, UCLA completed off a stunning comeback to take the next three games, 15-12, 15-6, 15-11 to win it all.

UCLA's comeback was one of the biggest in NCAA history; only one other team had ever rallied from two games to 0 to win in five games in the NCAA national championship (and did not again until 2009). UCLA finished their season 31-5.

The 1991 Final Four was held on the campus of UCLA at Pauley Pavilion.

Records
{|
| valign=top |

Brackets

West regional

Mideast regional

South regional

Northwest regional

Final Four - Pauley Pavilion, Los Angeles, California

See also
NCAA Women's Volleyball Championship

References

NCAA Women's Volleyball Championship
NCAA
Sports competitions in Los Angeles
NCAA Division I women's volleyball tournament
Volleyball in California
December 1991 sports events in the United States
Women's sports in California
Women in Los Angeles